Adel Mohamed Nourredine Gafaiti (born 16 July 1994) is a footballer who plays as a centre-back for Croatian Second Football League side NK Sesvete. Born in France, he represented Algeria at youth international level.

Early career

Rangers
Gafaiti began his career in the youth team at Nancy before joining Rangers in 2011, for whom he also played youth team football. However, after only one season in Scotland, Gafaiti was among nine players to be released upon their contract coming to an end in the summer due to the ongoing process of the club's administration.

Norwich City
During summer 2012, Gafaiti moved to Premier League side Norwich City from Rangers. He made 24 appearances for the Norwich U-21 side. On 1 July 2013, he was called up to the senior squad but made no appearances. Despite not making a first team appearance, Gafaiti was linked a move away from Norwich City, as clubs from Europe were keen to sign him.

During the January 2014 transfer window, Gafaiti moved to Football League One side Oldham Athletic on a season long loan. He made his debut on 22 March 2014 on a 1-0 home victory against Crawley Town, coming on in added time. Only just making one appearance, it was announced on 22 April that Gafaiti had returned to his parent club. After returning to his Norwich City, Gafaiti signed a two-year contract. Gafaiti continued to be in the club's development squad until his release at the end of the 2015-16 season.

MC Oran
After leaving Norwich City, Gafaiti moved to Algeria, signing for MC Oran.

Yeovil Town
In September 2018, Gafaiti returned to England to join the Endorsed Academy and signed for its partner club South West Peninsula League Division One side Mousehole. On 24 November 2018, Gafaiti signed for EFL League Two side Yeovil Town on a short-term contract. At the end of the 2018–19 season, Gafaiti was released by Yeovil following the club's relegation from the Football League.

International career
Gafaiti chose to represent Algeria at international level, and was capped at the under-20 level.

Career statistics

References

External links
 

1994 births
Algeria youth international footballers
Algerian footballers
Algerian expatriate sportspeople in England
Algerian expatriate footballers
AS Nancy Lorraine players
Expatriate footballers in Scotland
Expatriate footballers in England
Algerian expatriate sportspeople in Scotland
French expatriate sportspeople in Scotland
French expatriate sportspeople in England
French footballers
French sportspeople of Algerian descent
Association football defenders
Living people
Norwich City F.C. players
Oldham Athletic A.F.C. players
People from Nanterre
English Football League players
Rangers F.C. players
MC Oran players
FC Zirka Kropyvnytskyi players
Yeovil Town F.C. players
Truro City F.C. players
Wealdstone F.C. players
Hayes & Yeading United F.C. players
NK Sesvete players
Expatriate footballers in Ukraine
Algerian expatriate sportspeople in Ukraine
French expatriate sportspeople in Ukraine
Expatriate footballers in Croatia
Algerian expatriate sportspeople in Croatia
French expatriate sportspeople in Croatia
Ukrainian Premier League players
Footballers from Hauts-de-Seine
Southern Football League players
First Football League (Croatia) players
Mousehole A.F.C. players